The Arizona Streak is a 1926 American silent Western film directed by Robert De Lacey and starring Tom Tyler, Frankie Darro and Ada Mae Vaughn.

Cast
 Tom Tyler as Dandy Carrell 
 Alfred Hewston as Smiling Morn 
 Ada Mae Vaughn as Ruth Castleman 
 Frankie Darro as Mike 
 Dave Ward as Denver 
 LeRoy Mason as Velvet Hamilton 
 Gunboat Smith as Jim

References

External links
 

1926 films
1926 Western (genre) films
Films directed by Robert De Lacey
Film Booking Offices of America films
American black-and-white films
Silent American Western (genre) films
1920s English-language films
1920s American films